Osmar Fortes Barcellos, best known as Tesourinha (born in Porto Alegre, Rio Grande do Sul, 3 December 1921 – died on 17 June 1979) was an association footballer famous for his remarkable dribbling skills.

With Carlitos (footballer, born 1921) and Adãozinho formed most invaluable three striker attack of the 1940s. He started career for Sport Club Internacional in 1939, and scored 176 goals for this club.

Clubs
 Internacional: 1939–1949
 Vasco da Gama: 1949–1952
 Grêmio: 1952–1955
 Nacional (RS): 1955–1957

Honours
 Campeonato Gaúcho: eight times (1940, 1941, 1942, 1943, 1944, 1945, 1947 and 1948).
 Campeonato Carioca: 1950.
 Copa América: 1949, with Brazil national football team.

1921 births
1979 deaths
Footballers from Porto Alegre
Association football forwards
Brazilian footballers
Brazil international footballers
1949 South American Championship players
Grêmio Foot-Ball Porto Alegrense players
Sport Club Internacional players
CR Vasco da Gama players
Copa América-winning players